Buffalo Independent School District is a public school district based in Buffalo, Texas, United States.

The district is located in northern Leon County and extends into southern Freestone County.

In 2010, the school district was rated "Recognized" by the Texas Education Agency.

Schools

Buffalo High (Grades 9-12)
Buffalo High School is located 1724 N. Buffalo Ave. The current principal is John Clements. 
The construction for the new high school building finished in 2010, with spacious halls that resemble a college campus. There are four wings, each representing a different college. These four are the Texas A&M hall, which serves as the language hallway; the Texas Tech hall, which serves as the elective hallway; the University of Texas hall, which serves as the math and history hall; and the Baylor University hall, which serves as the science hall. The most noticeable add-on to the school is the gymnasium. The gymnasium is adjacent to the cafeteria which has a glass wall allowing one to look over the gym while eating and conversing. In 2010, the High School received an Academically Acceptable rating by the TEA.
Buffalo Junior Highs (Grades 4-8)
The Buffalo Junior High schools are located at 145 Bison Trail, the location of the former high school. The current principal is Lacy Freeman. The Lower Junior High has the 4th and 5th graders, and the Upper Junior High has the 6th through 8th graders.
Buffalo Elementary (Grades PK-3)
Buffalo Elementary is located at 1700 E Commerce Street. The current principal is Johnny Veretto. The Elementary consists of grades PK-3. Every year the Elementary students participate in Field Day. The Elementary has received a Recognized rating by the TEA four years in a row, from 2007-2010.

School board

Buffalo High School's school board currently consists of Jack Helmcamp as president, John Rodell as vice president, Bobby Fishbeck as secretary, Bradley Ezell as an alternate, and Randy Ayres, Monty McGill, and Brent Ryder as members.

Superintendents

The current superintendent at Buffalo High School is Lacey Freeman, who has been serving since 2012. The superintendents before him were Jackie Thomason (2005-2012), Charles Luke (2002-2005), Paul Vranish (2000-2002), and Floyd L. Jackson (1994-1999).

Athletics

The girls basketball team won the state championship in 2002.

Notable alumni

Rebecca Robinson, 2002, Miss Teen Texas 2000 & Miss Texas 2008

References

External links
Buffalo ISD
Buffalo ISD

School districts in Leon County, Texas
School districts in Freestone County, Texas